The 3rd Secretariat of the Communist Party of Cuba (PCC) was elected in 1986 by the 1st Plenary Session of the 3rd Central Committee in the immediate aftermath of the 3rd Congress.

Officers

Members

Changes

References

Specific

Bibliography
Articles and journals:
 

3rd Secretariat of the Communist Party of Cuba
1986 establishments in Cuba
1991 disestablishments in Cuba